Oktyabrskoye is a rural locality (a selo) in Sibirsky Selsoviet, Pervomaysky District, Altai Krai, Russia. The population was 392 as of 2013. There are 7 streets.

Geography 
Oktyabrskoye is located 24 km north of Novoaltaysk (the district's administrative centre) by road. Sibirsky is the nearest rural locality.

References 

Rural localities in Pervomaysky District, Altai Krai